Lyonia is a genus of flowering plants in the family Ericaceae. There are about 35 species native to Asia and North America.

These are shrubs and trees, deciduous or evergreen. Some have rhizomes. The leaves are spirally arranged and the inflorescences grow in the leaf axils. The flowers are usually white, sometimes red. The fruit is a capsule.

Fossil record
37 fossil fruits of †Lyonia danica have been described from middle Miocene strata of the Fasterholt area near Silkeborg in Central Jutland, Denmark.

Species 
Include:
Lyonia elliptica
Lyonia ferruginea
Lyonia fruticosa
Lyonia jamaicensis
Lyonia ligustrina
Lyonia lucida
Lyonia maestrensis
Lyonia mariana
Lyonia octandra
Lyonia ovalifolia
Lyonia truncata

References

 
Ericaceae genera